Veerle Ingels (born 24 December 1981) is a Belgian racing cyclist. She participates both in road cycling as in cyclo-cross. In 2005, she became Belgian national champion in cyclo-cross.

Honours

Road cycling
2003 : 3rd in Belgian elite national championships

Cyclo-cross
2003 : 3rd in Belgian elite national championships
2005 : 1st in Belgian elite national championships
2005 : 3rd in Koppenberg
2005 : 2nd in Gavere-Asper
2006 : 1st in Lebbeke
2006 : 3rd in Gavere-Asper (2006/07 Cyclo-cross Superprestige)

External links

Living people
1981 births
Belgian female cyclists
Cyclo-cross cyclists
Cyclists from East Flanders
People from Eeklo
Belgian cyclo-cross champions
21st-century Belgian women